Lebanon national team can refer to different sports:

 Lebanon men's national ball hockey team, men's ball hockey
 Lebanon men's national basketball team, men's basketball
 Lebanon women's national basketball team, women's basketball
 Lebanon national beach soccer team, men's beach soccer
 Lebanon national football team, men's football
 Lebanon women's national football team, women's football
 Lebanon national futsal team, men's futsal
 Lebanon women's national futsal team, women's futsal
 Lebanon men's national handball team, men's handball
 Lebanon men's national ice hockey team, men's ice hockey
 Lebanon national rugby league team, men's rugby league
 Lebanon national rugby union team, men's rugby union
 Lebanon men's national volleyball team, men's volleyball

See also
 Lebanon national basketball team